Golconde Dormitory, or Golconde, is a private residence for the Sri Aurobindo Ashram in the town of Puducherry, India designed by architect Antonin Raymond, completed in 1942. Raymond designed the building to mitigate the effects of the hot and humid climate using reinforced concrete, the first building in India to use this technique, recognized as "The first modernist building in India".

Raymond first came to Japan in 1919 to work as project architect for Frank Lloyd Wright's Imperial Hotel in Tokyo. George Nakashima worked for Raymond to conduct site visits in Japan, and was later assigned to supervise the Golconde project, along with Czech architect Francois Sammer.

References

Buildings and structures in Puducherry